Rear-Admiral John Bowen (baptised 14 February 178020 October 1827) was a Royal Navy officer and colonial administrator, who led the first settlement of Tasmania at Risdon Cove.

Early life and career
John Bowen was the son of James Bowen, and was born at Ilfracombe, Devon, England. He began his naval career in March 1794 and graduated from the Royal Naval College, Dartmouth. As a midshipman Bowen joined , which was commanded by his father. In April 1802 when as a lieutenant he joined  at the Cape of Good Hope, South Africa. He arrived at Port Jackson on 11 March 1803. Governor King soon appointed him to form the new settlement at Risdon Cove, Van Diemen's Land. Peter Timms suggests that Bowen was chosen "because King could not spare anyone more experienced".

Hobart settlement
The expedition left at the end of August, with Bowen commanding the Albion. He arrived at Risdon Cove on 12 September 1803. Among the original 49 settlers at Risdon Cove, which became Hobart, were 21 male and 3 female convicts, members of the New South Wales Corps and free settlers and their families.
 
In January 1804 Bowen, in Ferrett, left for Sydney so that he could return to the navy in the then current war against France, however Governor King told him to return to Risdon via the failing Port Phillip settlement and to resettle either at Hobart or Port Dalrymple, and requested Bowen to deliver administration of the Risdon settlement to David Collins.

In his two years in Tasmania Bowen explored the Richmond area, discovering coal and naming area the Coal River. In May 1804 he explored the Huon River. While at Risdon, Bowen lived with Martha Hayes, who bore him two daughters; Henrietta in 1804 (d. 1823), and Martha Charlotte in 1805.

After Hobart
King paid him £100 to defray his expenses and recommended him for promotion. In May 1804 Bowen was promoted commander and in January 1806 he became captain. In February 1811 he wrote to Robert Peel, Under-Secretary of State for War and the Colonies, suggesting that he should succeed Collins as Lieutenant-Governor of Van Diemen's Land. This was subsequently rejected as it was believed that as a naval officer he could not command troops.
 

Returning to England on 13 May 1825, he married Elizabeth Lindley Cloves. After a long illness he died at Ilfracombe in 1827, aged 47.

References

External links
Celebration of the 200th Anniversary of the State of Tasmania.
Australian Dictionary of Biography entry for John Bowen.

1780 births
1827 deaths
Settlers of Tasmania
Royal Navy rear admirals
19th-century Australian public servants